Charyl Yannis Chappuis (born 12 January 1992) is a Thai professional footballer who plays as a midfielder for Thai League 1 club Port.

Early career
Chappuis began his playing career with hometown club FC Kloten but soon moved on to SC YF Juventus, spending some time in their youth ranks. He was on the move again though as Swiss Super League side Grasshopper Club snapped up the promising midfielder in July 2003.

Club career

Grasshoppers
Chappuis moved up through Grasshopper's youth system, soon playing regularly for the reserves but not being able to break into the first team though he was named in match day squads several times as he began training with the senior team.

Locarno and Lugano loans
In order to get some first team experience he went on loan to FC Locarno for the 2011–2012 season. He made his debut for Locarno on 25 July 2011 against FC Wohlen and scored the first goal of his loan spell in a 2–1 away win versus FC Wil on 20 November 2011. Chappuis returned to Grasshopper at the end of the term and was immediately loan out again, this time to FC Lugano for the duration of the 2012–2013 season. He made his debut for Lugano on 14 July 2012 against FC Wil in a 3–1 victory.

Buriram United

In 2013, Chappuis moved to Thailand to join Buriram United. He scored his first Buriram goal against Suphanburi FC, he scored by curling a corner into the second post. He also scored a goal in the 2013 AFC Champions League against Jiangsu Sainty, but twisted his knee and was ruled out for three months while celebrating the goal. Chappuis scored his second goal against Chainat FC on September 8, 2013.

Suphanburi
After spent the second leg of 2014 season at Suphanburi by the loan contract from Buriram, Chappuis joined Suphanburi F.C. for the 2015 season, joining the likes of Jakkaphan Pornsai along with his former Buriram teammates Carmelo Gonzalez  and Pratum Chuthong.

Chappuis missed the whole 2015 season however with a knee injury that required surgery. He also missed the 2015 SEA Games Tournament.

After missing nearly 16 months out injured, Chappuis finally made his return in a 3–1 win in a friendly match against Simork. Chappuis made his league return on 8 May 2016 coming on as a substitute in the 80th minute for goalscorer Carmelo in a 1–0 win over Army United.

International career
Chappuis was a Swiss youth international. In 2009, he was part of the Swiss under-17 team that won the 2009 FIFA U-17 World Cup that defeated the host nation Nigeria 1–0 in the final, featuring in all seven matches at the tournament.

Chappuis was called up by Thailand's ex-coach Winfried Schäfer to play against Lebanon for the 2015 AFC Asian Cup qualification phase.

He was called up to the Thailand U23 team by coach Kiatisuk Senamuang to compete in the 2013 Southeast Asian Games. His unofficial debut] was a friendly match against FC Barcelona, during FC Barcelona's tour in Bangkok. Chappuis made his official debut against Uganda in November 2013.

Chappuis won a gold medal at the 2013 Southeast Asian Games with Thailand.

He represented Thailand at the 2014 Asian Games. Chappuis was also part of the senior squad that won the 2014 AFF Suzuki Cup. In Thailand's first game, Chappuis scored a last-minute penalty against Singapore to seal a 2–1 win over the hosts. He also found the net in the next game as Thailand came from behind to beat Malaysia 3–2. Chappuis had a disappointing semi-final but in the first leg of the final, he scored another penalty in a 2–0 win over Malaysia. In the second leg of the final, Thailand lost 3-2 but still won overall with Chappuis finding the net yet again after the Malaysian goalkeeper parried Sarach Yooyen's free kick into his path.

In August 2016, after a 20-month absence from the national team due to injury, Chappuis was recalled to the national team for the 2018 FIFA World Cup qualification phase in September 2016.

Personal life
Chappuis grew up in Kloten, Switzerland.  He speaks German, English and French fluently, and he has become more fluent in Thai.

Chappuis's favorite football team is Barcelona and his dream league to play in would be the Bundesliga. His Instagram has gathered more than one million followers in 2018.

Chappuis began dating Helena Busch, a Thai model, in December 2017. Chappuis announced their engagement on February 14, 2021, after three years of dating.

On 12 April 2021, it was announced that Chappuis tested positive for COVID-19, while being asymptomatic, amid its pandemic in Thailand. He became the first player in the Thai League to have tested positive for COVID-19.

Statistics

International

Thailand

Honours

Club
Buriram United
 Thai Premier League (1): 2013
 Thai FA Cup (1): 2013
 Thai League Cup (1): 2013
 Kor Royal Cup (1): 2013, 2014
Muangthong United
 Thai League Cup (1): 2017
 Mekong Club Championship (1): 2017

International
Switzerland U-17
 FIFA U-17 World Cup (1): 2009

Thailand U-23
 Sea Games  Gold Medal (1): 2013

Thailand
 AFF Championship (2): 2014, 2016

Royal decoration
 2015 -  Silver Medalist (Seventh Class) of The Most Admirable Order of the Direkgunabhorn

References

External links

Charyl Chappuis official Website
 
 

1992 births
Living people
People from Bülach District
Charyl Chappuis
Swiss men's footballers
Charyl Chappuis
Charyl Chappuis
Switzerland youth international footballers
Swiss people of Thai descent
Charyl Chappuis
Association football midfielders
Swiss Challenge League players
Grasshopper Club Zürich players
FC Locarno players
Charyl Chappuis
Charyl Chappuis
Charyl Chappuis
Charyl Chappuis
Swiss expatriate footballers
Swiss expatriate sportspeople in Thailand
Expatriate footballers in Thailand
Footballers at the 2014 Asian Games
Charyl Chappuis
Southeast Asian Games medalists in football
Charyl Chappuis
Competitors at the 2013 Southeast Asian Games
Charyl Chappuis
Thai expatriate sportspeople in Switzerland
Sportspeople from the canton of Zürich